Strychnos benthami is a species of plant in the Loganiaceae family. It is endemic to Sri Lanka.

References

Flora of Sri Lanka
benthami
Vulnerable plants
Taxonomy articles created by Polbot